This is a list of Iraqi/Mesopotamian musicians and musical groups.

Classical 

 Nazem Al Ghazali  
 Yusuf Za'arur
 Afifa Iskandar
 Salima Pasha
 Munir Bashir
 Jamil Bachir
 Naseer Shamma
 Omar Bashir
 Rahim AlHaj
 Sahar Taha
 Zaidoon Treeko
 Salman Shukur
 Ahmed Mukhtar
 Ashur Bet Sargis
 Hanna Petros
 Paulus Khofri
 Nawfal Shamoun
 Farida Mohammad Ali
 Linda George 
 Amal Khudhair
 Aida Nadeem
 Seta Hagopian
 Simor Jalal
 Solhi al-Wadi
 Hamid al-Saadi
 Rachid Al-Qundarchi
 Youssouf Omar
 Hassan Chewke
 Najim Al-Sheikhli
 Mohammed Al-Qubanchi
 Salim Shibbeth
 Saleh and Daoud al-Kuwaity

Classical/modern 

 Ilham al-Madfai
 Haitham Yousif
 Kadim Al Sahir
 Rida Al Abdullah
Hatem Al Iraqi

Bands

Songwriters

References 

Lists of musicians by nationality